The Marsh Award for Conservation Biology, established 1991, is an award run in partnership between the Zoological Society of London (ZSL) and the Marsh Charitable Trust that recognises an individual for his or her "contributions of fundamental science to the conservation of animal species and habitats".

Recipients

1991 – Robert M. May
1992 – Derek A. Ratcliffe
1993 – Georgina M. Mace
1994 – Ian Newton
1995 – John Goss-Custard
1996 – Jeremy A. Thomas
1997 – Rhys E. Green
1998 – Peter S. Maitland
1999 – John Croxall
2000 – Andrew Balmford
2001 – E.J. Milner-Gulland
2002 – Callum Roberts
2003 – Stuart Pimm
2004 – Chris D. Thomas
2005 – William J. Sutherland
2006 – Sarah Wanless
2007 – Stuart Butchart
2008 – Isabelle M. Côté
2009 – Ana Rodrigues
2010 – Paul Donald
2011 – Jane Hill
2012 – Dave Goulson
2013 – Debbie Pain
2014 – Ben Collen
2015 – Stephen Redpath
2016 – Richard Griffiths
2017 – Susan Cheyne
2018 – Steffen Oppel
2020 - Michael W. Bruford
 2021 - Rosie Woodroffe
 2022 - Kate Jones

See also

 Marsh Ecology Award
 List of environmental awards

References

Ecology
1991 establishments in the United Kingdom
British awards
Environmental awards